Gregg Andrew Hurwitz is an American novelist, screenwriter, and comic book writer. Most of his novels are in the thriller fiction genre. His script writing work includes a film adaptation of his book Orphan X, a TV adaptation of Joby Warrick's Black Flags: The Rise of ISIS, and a screenplay for the 2017 film The Book of Henry. He also has written comic books for comic book publishers like DC Comics and Marvel Comics.

Personal life and education
Hurwitz grew up in the San Francisco Bay Area and graduated from Bellarmine College Preparatory in San Jose, California. While completing a Bachelor of Arts degree from Harvard University (1995) and a master's from Trinity College, Oxford in Shakespearean tragedy (1996), he wrote his first novel. At Harvard, he was a student of psychologist Jordan Peterson, who influenced his writing. He was the undergraduate scholar-athlete of the year at Harvard for pole vaulting and played college soccer in England, where he was a Knox Fellow.

Hurwitz lives in Los Angeles. He is married and has two daughters.

Career
Hurwitz is the author of The Tower, Minutes to Burn, Do No Harm, The Kill Clause, The Program, Troubleshooter, Last Shot, The Crime Writer, Trust No One, Don't Look Back, and Orphan X. His books have been shortlisted for best novel of the year by the International Thriller Writers, nominated for the CWA Ian Fleming Steel Dagger, chosen as feature selections for four major literary book clubs, honored as Book Sense Picks, and translated into 28 languages.

He wrote the original screenplay for the film The Book of Henry (2017), directed by Collin Trevorrow for Sidney Kimmel Entertainment, and filmed in New York.

His 2016 novel Orphan X was picked up by Warner Bros. with Bradley Cooper to direct. Hurwitz will write the screenplay adaptation. Hurwitz has written Wolverine, The Punisher, and Foolkiller for Marvel Comics, and published numerous academic articles on Shakespeare. He has taught fiction writing in the USC English Department, and guest lectured for UCLA and Harvard. He also has written and produced season two of the TV show V.

He became the writer of Batman: The Dark Knight for DC Comics in 2012.

Bibliography

Novels

Orphan X Thrillers series 
 Orphan X, January 2016
 The Nowhere Man, January 2017
 Hellbent, January 2018
 Out of the Dark, January 2019
 Into the Fire, January 2020
Prodigal Son, January 2021
Dark Horse, February 2022
The Last Orphan, February 2023

Orphan X short stories 
Released as ebook and audiobook only

 "Buy a Bullet", (Book 1.5) October 2016
 "The Intern", (Book 3.5) December 2018
"The List", (Book 5.5) August 2020

The Rains Brothers 
 The Rains, October 2016
 Last Chance, October 2017

Tim Rackley 
 The Kill Clause, August 2004
 The Program, August 2005
 Troubleshooter, July 2006
 Last Shot, July 2007

Stand-alones 
 The Tower, April 1999
 Minutes to Burn, July 2001
 Do No Harm, July 2002
 The Crime Writer (also known as I See You), June 2008
 Trust No One (UK title as We Know), June 2010
 You're Next, November 2010
 They're Watching (UK title as Or She Dies), April 2011
 The Survivor, July 2012
 Tell No Lies, August 2013
 Don't Look Back, August 2014

Comic books

DC Comics
 Batman: The Dark Knight #10–29, 0, Annual #1, 2012–2014
 Detective Comics #0, 27, 2012–2014
 Penguin: Pain and Prejudice #1–5, 2011–2012

Marvel Comics
 Foolkiller vol. 2 #1–5, 2007 
 Foolkiller: White Angels #1–5, 2008–2009
 The New Avengers #55, 2009
 Punisher #61–65, 75, 2008–2009
 The Savage Axe of Ares #1, 2011
 The Vengeance of Moon Knight #1–10, 2009–2010
 Shadowland: Moon Knight #1–3, 2010
 Wolverine Annual #1, 2007
 Wolverine: Flies to a Spider #1, 2009
 Wolverine: Switchback #1, 2009
 X-Men Forever #4, 2009

Filmography

Television
 V (7 episodes, 2010–11)
 Queen of the South (Season 1 Episode 8: Billete de Magia)

Film
 The Book of Henry
 Sweet Girl

References

External links
 
 MacMillan author page
 
 Gregg Hurwitz at Mike's Amazing World of Comics
 Gregg Hurwitz at the Unofficial Handbook of Marvel Comics Creators
 

20th-century American novelists
20th-century American male writers
21st-century American novelists
21st-century American male writers
Alumni of Trinity College, Oxford
American comics writers
American crime fiction writers
American male novelists
American male screenwriters
American mystery novelists
Harvard University alumni
Living people
Writers from the San Francisco Bay Area
Year of birth missing (living people)
Screenwriters from California
21st-century American screenwriters